The Capone Investment is a drama series from 1974 concerning the whereabouts of Al Capone's illegal gains, garnered during the Prohibition era .

Synopsis

Chief Inspector Reaygo is assigned to investigate the murder of an American man named Milland, who was shot by a sniper. He is paired with Wheatfield, an agent of shadowy government agency DI6. They soon discover a second body, that of Milland's associate, who has been shot in identical circumstances. These two deaths are followed shortly by that of George Hunter, a local businessman.

Hunter's son Tom decides to investigate his father's murder. Tom discovers his father was spending beyond his means and was linked to local publican Duncan Hall and a mysterious American man named Anderson. While Tom questions his late father's friends and business colleagues, further deaths occur; George's butler is run down by a mystery car, his friend Abigail is electrocuted in her swimming pool and Duncan survives a sniper attack.

The butler had mentioned the Capone Investment to Reaygo before he died. Wheatfield briefs Reaygo on the Capone Investment, a large sum of money brought to Britain in the 1920s on behalf of Al Capone by an associate who died shortly after arriving. The nature and whereabouts of the investment are unknown, but it is understood to be worth millions.

Reaygo and Wheatfield discover duplicate accounts ledgers from Hunter's company and go to a London finance company, where they learn more about Capone's investment. They deduce that George Hunter had discovered the investment when he had tried to gain full control of the business that he partly owned. Hunter had arranged for payments to be directed to him instead of the shell company that received income from the investment and that Anderson was sent to Britain to eliminate Hunter when his scam was discovered. Tracing Anderson to a hotel, Reaygo and Wheatfield discover his body and the murder weapon. Newspaper used to wrap the gun has Tom Hunter's fingerprints on it.

As they travel back from London, Reaygo unravels the details of the murders; Anderson performed the first three killings then a second killer began eliminating Hunter's associates. Reaygo confronts Wheatfield with the accusation that he is the second killer and has tried to frame Tom Hunter for the murders. Wheatfield produces a gun and confesses that he has tried to locate the investment for years. He drives Reagyo to the village cricket match where the remaining associates of Hunter have gathered. At the cricket match, Wheatfield is killed by a police marksman as tries for a second time to kill Duncan Hall.

Cast
 Glyn Owen as Reaygo 
 Peter Sallis as Wheatfield 
 Isobel Black as Fran 
 John Thaw as Tom 
 Roland Curram as Bunty 
 Jill Dixon as Abigail 
 Richard Coleman as Duncan Hall 
 John Bown as Metcalfe 
 Richard Shaw as Greener

External links
 

1970s British drama television series
1974 British television series debuts
1974 British television series endings
Television shows produced by Southern Television
English-language television shows